The Batak script (natively known as surat Batak, surat na sampulu sia ("the nineteen letters"), or si-sia-sia) is a writing system used to write the Austronesian Batak languages spoken by several million people on the Indonesian island of Sumatra. The script may be derived from the Kawi and Pallava script, ultimately derived from the Brahmi script of India, or from the hypothetical Proto-Sumatran script influenced by Pallava.

History

The Batak magicians and priests or datu used the Batak script mainly for magical texts and divinatory purposes. It is unknown how many non-specialists were literate in the Batak script, but judging from the widespread tradition of writing love laments, especially among the Karo, Simalungun, and Angkola-Mandailing Batak, it is likely that a considerable part of the non-specialist population was able to read and write the Batak script. After the arrival of Europeans in the Batak lands, first German missionaries and, from 1878 onwards, the Dutch, the Batak script was, alongside the Roman script, taught in the schools, and teaching and religious materials were printed in the Batak script. Soon after the first World War the missionaries decided to discontinue printing books in the Batak script. The script soon fell out of use and is now only used for ornamental purposes.

Origin

The Batak script was probably derived from Pallava and Old Kawi scripts, which ultimately were derived from the Brahmi script, the root of almost all the Indic and Southeast Asian scripts.

Structure

Batak is written from left to right and top to bottom. Other vowels, final ŋ, and final velar fricative  are indicated by diacritics, which appear above, below, or after the letter. For example, ba is written ba (one letter); bi is written ba.i (i follows the consonant); bang is written baŋ (ŋ is above the consonant); and bing is baŋ.i. Final consonants are written with the pangolat (here represented by "#"): bam is ba.ma.#. However, bim is written ba.ma.i.#: the first diacritic belongs to the first consonant, and the second belongs to the second consonant, but both are written at the end of the entire syllable. Unlike most Brahmi-based scripts, Batak does not form consonant conjuncts.

Basic characters

The basic characters are called surat. The script varies by region and language. The major variants are between
Karo,
Mandailing,
Pakpak/Dairi,
Simalungun/Timur, and
Toba:

Alternate forms:

  (used in Mandailing)

Diacritics

Diacritics are used to change the pronunciation of a character.  They can change the vowel from the inherent , mark a final [velar nasal] , mark a final velar fricative , or indicate a final consonant with no vowel:

Ligatures with U

The diacritic for U used by Mandailing, Pakpak, Simalungun, and Toba can form ligatures with its base character:

Tompi

In Mandailing, the diacritic tompi can be used to change the sound of some characters:

Placement of diacritics for Ng and H
The diacritics for Ng and H are usually written above spacing vowel diacritics instead of above the base character.
Examples:  ping,  pong,  peh, and  pih.

Diacritic reordering for closed syllables

Vowel diacritics are reordered for closed syllables (that is, syllables where the final consonant has no vowel).
Consonants with no vowel are marked by the Batak pangolat or panongonan diacritic, depending on the language.
When they are used for a closed syllable (like "tip"), both the vowel diacritic and the pangolat or panongonan are written at the end of the syllable.

Examples of closed syllables using pangolat:

Punctuation and ornaments

Batak is normally written without spaces or punctuation (as scriptio continua). However, special marks or bindu are occasionally used.
They vary greatly in size and design from manuscript to manuscript.

Unicode

Batak script was added to the Unicode Standard in October 2010 with the release of version 6.0.

Block

The Unicode block for Batak is U+1BC0–U+1BFF:

Rendering

Unicode fonts for Batak must handle several requirements to properly render text:

Gallery

See also
Sitopayan I inscription, 13th century usage of mixed Malay and Batak scripts

Citations

Sources

External links

 Entry on Batak at Omniglot.com – A guide to writing systems
 Transtoba2 – Roman to Toba Batak script transliteration software by Uli Kozok and Leander Seige (GNU GPL)
 Uli Kozok's Batak Script website with free Batak fonts.
http://unicode-table.com/en/sections/batak/
Full Batak manuscript at SOAS University of London.

Indonesian scripts
Brahmic scripts
North Sumatra
Batak